Diamondville is a town in Lincoln County, Wyoming, United States. The population was 737 at the 2010 census.

History
Harrison Church discovered coal near the Hams Fork River in 1868. He gathered financial backing from a group in Minneapolis, and they formed the Hams Fork River Coal Company. Diamondville was built to house the miners, and the town was incorporated in 1896.

The town was named for the superior-grade coal that came from the local mines. The coal resembled black diamonds.

Geography
Diamondville is located at  (41.775192, -110.537989).

Demographics

2010 census
As of the census of 2010, there were 737 people, 320 households, and 203 families living in the town. The racial makeup of the town was 93.4% White, 0.1% African American, 0.7% Native American, 0.4% Asian, 0.3% Pacific Islander, 2.8% from other races, and 2.3% from two or more races. Hispanic or Latino of any race were 9.1% of the population.

There were 320 households, of which 27.2% had children under the age of 18 living with them, 51.3% were married couples living together, 6.3% had a female householder with no husband present, 5.9% had a male householder with no wife present, and 36.6% were non-families. 30.0% of all households were made up of individuals, and 12.2% had someone living alone who was 65 years of age or older. The average household size was 2.30 and the average family size was 2.86.

The median age in the town was 42.5 years. 21% of residents were under the age of 18; 7.5% were between the ages of 18 and 24; 23.5% were from 25 to 44; 33.5% were from 45 to 64; and 14.5% were 65 years of age or older. The gender makeup of the town was 49.5% male and 50.5% female.

2000 census
As of the census of 2000, there were 716 people, 304 households, and 199 families living in the town. The population density was 546.9 people per square mile (211.0/km2). There were 322 housing units at an average density of 245.9 per square mile (94.9/km2). The racial makeup of the town was 96.51% White, 0.84% Native American, 0.70% Asian, 1.12% from other races, and 0.84% from two or more races. Hispanic or Latino of any race were 4.61% of the population.

There were 304 households, out of which 28.0% had children under the age of 18 living with them, 53.0% were married couples living together, 8.2% had a female householder with no husband present, and 34.5% were non-families. 31.6% of all households were made up of individuals, and 14.1% had someone living alone who was 65 years of age or older. The average household size was 2.36 and the average family size was 2.93.

In the town, the population was spread out, with 26.4% under the age of 18, 5.6% from 18 to 24, 26.5% from 25 to 44, 28.5% from 45 to 64, and 13.0% who were 65 years of age or older. The median age was 40 years. For every 100 females, there were 94.0 males. For every 100 females age 18 and over, there were 95.9 males.

The median income for a household in the town was $39,333, and the median income for a family was $48,000. Males had a median income of $45,694 versus $26,250 for females. The per capita income for the town was $21,696. About 10.6% of families and 12.5% of the population were below the poverty line, including 16.1% of those under age 18 and 5.0% of those age 65 or over.

Tourism

 Hunting
 Fishing
 Camping
 Festivals
 Skiing 
 Ice Fishing
 Fossil Butte National Monument

See also

 List of municipalities in Wyoming

References

External links

 

Towns in Lincoln County, Wyoming
Towns in Wyoming
Coal towns in Wyoming